Paragamasellevans is a genus of mites in the family Rhodacaridae. There are at least two described species in Paragamasellevans.

Species
These two species belong to the genus Paragamasellevans:
 Paragamasellevans michaeli Loots & Ryke, 1968
 Paragamasellevans vandenbergi Loots & Ryke, 1968

References

Rhodacaridae